West 65 is a residential complex in New Belgrade. It is located at the corner of Omladinskih Brigada Street and the inner city ring road. The location features a well-developed traffic infrastructure and public transportation network, allowing quick and convenient access to any other part of the city. The immediate vicinity has shopping, office and service centers. It is about 15 minutes from the city center. It includes 11 six-story residential buildings, a mall and a  tower in New Belgrade's Blok 65. It is the second tallest building in Belgrade after the Belgrade Tower.

Commercial section
The commercial section of the complex consists of retail shops located on the ground floor of the residential buildings and a modern shopping center. It is modeled after pedestrian zones. It will include a supermarket, speciality stores, retail shops, catering and service facilities, a spa and wellness center, and entertainment facilities for children, teenagers and adults.

On 25 December 2021 Novak Djokovic played tennis on the street outside the West 65 tower.

Multipurpose tower
In accordance with the architectural concept, the corner of Omladinskih Brigada Street and the inner city ring road will have one of the tallest and most modern buildings in Belgrade. The tower will consist of two separate units.

Statistics
Land plot area: 30,316 m2
Superstructure area: 106,106 m2
Substructure area: 46,331 m2
Number of apartments: 514
Number of retail shops: 100
Office space and hotel suite total area: 37,058 m2
Number of parking places: 1,324
Open space area: 15,484 m2
Number of new plant units: 172

Gallery

References

External links

 

Buildings and structures in Belgrade
New Belgrade
Shopping malls in Belgrade
Skyscrapers in Serbia
Towers in Serbia